The Anglo-Irish Treaty was signed in London on 6 December 1921 and Dáil Éireann voted to approve the treaty on 7 January 1922, following a debate through late December 1921 and into January 1922. The vote was 64 in favour, 57 against, with the Ceann Comhairle and 3 others not voting. The Sinn Féin party split into opposing sides in the aftermath of the Treaty vote, which led to the Irish Civil War from June 1922 to May 1923.

Background

Two elections took place in Ireland in 1921, as a result of the Government of Ireland Act 1920 to establish the House of Commons of Northern Ireland and the House of Commons of Southern Ireland. The election was used by the Irish Republic as the basis of membership of the Second Dáil. The general election to the Northern Ireland House of Commons occurred on 24 May. Of 52 seats, forty were won by unionists, six by moderate Irish nationalists and six by Sinn Féin. No actual polling took place in the Southern Ireland constituencies, as all 128 candidates were returned unopposed. Given the backdrop of the increasingly violent War of Independence, any candidates opposed to Sinn Féin and their supporters could expect to be harassed by the Irish Republican Army (IRA). Supporters of the Labour Party stood aside to allow the constitutional situation to run its course. Of these 128, 124 were won by Sinn Féin, and four by independent unionists representing Dublin University.

Only the Sinn Féin candidates recognised the Second Dáil and five of these had been elected in two constituencies, one in each part of Ireland, so the total number of members who assembled in the Second Dáil was 125.

During the Second Dáil, the government of the Irish Republic and the British government of David Lloyd George agreed to hold peace negotiations. On 14 September 1921 the Dáil ratified the appointment of Arthur Griffith, Michael Collins, Robert Barton, Eamonn Duggan and George Gavan Duffy as envoys plenipotentiary for the peace conference in England. These envoys eventually signed the Anglo-Irish Treaty on 6 December. After almost a month of acrimonious debate the treaty was formally ratified by Dáil Éireann on 7 January 1922.

Vote

The Ceann Comhairle Eoin MacNeill absented himself from the vote in accordance with standing orders. It was ruled that the four other TDs, Michael Collins, Arthur Griffith, Éamon de Valera and Seán Milroy, who had been elected for two constituencies (for both the House of Commons of Southern Ireland and the House of Commons of Northern Ireland) would only cast one vote each.  Of the 124 Teachtaí Dála (TDs) who were entitled to vote as a result of these rulings, 121 cast their vote in the Dáil, and three abstained. The result of the vote was: 64 in favour of the Treaty and 57 against. Three TDs eligible to vote did not do so:
Frank Drohan resigned his seat on 5 January 1922, because he was personally anti-Treaty while his local Sinn Féin branch was pro-Treaty.
Laurence Ginnell (anti-Treaty) was absent in Argentina
Thomas Kelly (pro-Treaty) was ill

Aftermath
To satisfy the requirements of the British constitution, the treaty also had to be ratified by the House of Commons of Southern Ireland. Thus Irish nationalists ended their boycott of the home rule parliament to attend the southern House of Commons as MPs. This they did alongside the four Unionist MPs who had refused to recognise the Dáil. In this way the treaty was ratified a second time in Dublin, this time unanimously as the anti-Treaty TDs refused to attend.

Under the terms of the Anglo-Irish Treaty a provisional parliament, considered by nationalists to be the Third Dáil, was elected in the 1922 general election on 16 June. Collins and de Valera agreed a pact between the pro- and anti-Treaty wings of Sinn Féin and this pact and the elections were endorsed by the Second Dáil. The new assembly was recognised both by nationalists and the British Government and so replaced both the Parliament of Southern Ireland and the Second Dáil with a single body. The anti-Treaty groups of IRA members, TDs and their supporters were still bitterly opposed to the settlement, despite the election result, and this led on to the Irish Civil War.

See also
Easter Rising
Irish Free State
Members of the 2nd Dáil

References

External links
Contemporaneous record of the debate on the Treaty in Dáil Éireann.
Record of the Dáil debate on the Treaty and vote on the 7 January 1922.
De Valera's preferred Treaty, 'Document No.2', published on 10 January 1922.
Dáil may not vote before Christmas – New York Times archive, 19 December 1921.

Politics of Ireland
History of Ireland (1801–1923)
1922 in Ireland
Assembly votes